Stuart Skinner (born November 1, 1998) is a Canadian professional ice hockey goaltender for the Edmonton Oilers of the National Hockey League (NHL). He was a third round selection, 78th overall, in the 2017 NHL Entry Draft by the Oilers.

Playing career

Junior
Skinner played major junior hockey in the Western Hockey League with the Lethbridge Hurricanes and Swift Current Broncos.

On March 18, 2016, Skinner scored an empty net goal with the Lethbridge Hurricanes against the Medicine Hat Tigers, making him the only goaltender in franchise history and the seventh in WHL history to do so.

Edmonton Oilers
After his selection in the 2017 NHL Entry Draft, Skinner was later signed to a three-year, entry-level contract with the Edmonton Oilers on May 14, 2018.

Entering the final year of his entry-level contract, Skinner remained on the Oilers roster to start the pandemic delayed 2020–21 season. With an injury to veteran Mike Smith, Skinner served as the Oilers backup to Mikko Koskinen through the first 9 games. He made his NHL debut and first career start on January 31, 2021 against the Ottawa Senators, collecting his first win in an 8–5 victory. Skinner would spend the remainder of the season with the Bakersfield Condors of the American Hockey League (AHL). He would lead all goaltenders in wins with 20, and helped backstop Bakersfield to the Pacific Division Championship.

Skinner would split the 2021–22 season between the AHL and the NHL. On February 14, 2022, Skinner recorded his first NHL shutout against the San Jose Sharks, making 20 saves to win the game 3–0.

During the 2022–23 season, with the departure of Mikko Koskinen and injury to Mike Smith, Skinner was initially expected to be the backup to newly signed goaltender Jack Campbell. Skinner's strong play along with Campbell's struggling performance led Skinner to take over the starter position. On January 19, 2023, the NHL announced Skinner as one of three final skaters of the Pacific Division voted in the 2023 NHL All-Star Game, along with teammate Leon Draisaitl.

Personal life
Skinner is the youngest of nine siblings, all of which have first names that begin with the letter "S". He met his wife Chloe after a WHL game he played in Lethbridge; they married in June 2020. Skinners firstborn son Beau was born January 14 2023.

Career statistics

Regular season and playoffs

International

Awards and honours

References

External links

1998 births
Living people
Bakersfield Condors players
Edmonton Oilers draft picks
Edmonton Oilers players
Lethbridge Hurricanes players
Ice hockey people from Edmonton
Swift Current Broncos players
Wichita Thunder players